Tupton Hall School is a coeducational secondary school and sixth form located in Chesterfield in the English county of Derbyshire. It is one of the largest secondary schools in the North East Derbyshire district, with a large body of students and one of the largest sixth forms in the county.

History

Grammar school
Tupton Hall was founded as a Tupton Hall Grammar School in 1936 as a secondary school in the Clay Cross area on a site purchased by the Derbyshire Education Committee in 1929. In 1936, the school moved to its present site, formerly occupied by the mansion Tupton Hall. The original building was designed by G.H. Widdows, the county architect, and it was opened by Oliver Stanley, the Secretary of State for Education.

Comprehensive school

From 1967 to 1969, many new buildings were constructed to prepare for the transformation to becoming a much larger comprehensive school (750 pupils at the grammar school became 1,800 at the new comprehensive). The new school opened in 1969. The remodelled school was well regarded as an architectural achievement using the CLASP system which allowed standard components for school construction. Nicholas Pevsner described it as "one of the best uses of the CLASP system for school buildings in the country ... creating a village type atmosphere" Architects were George Grey & Partners in association with D.S. Davies (county architect).

The school was severely run down by the new millennium and the new school opened in Easter 2003.

New school
The school is a specialist sports college and is one of the most modern school buildings in the county, being the tester school for the new school design permeating throughout Derbyshire and the East Midlands with many modern features, built under a PFI scheme.

The school has been twinned with a school in Nigeria to further aid relations between Tupton and its twin village in Nigeria. It has also gained the full International Schools Award.

Previously a community school administered by Derbyshire County Council, in September 2019 Tupton Hall School converted to academy status. The school is now sponsored by the Redhill Academy Trust.

About Tupton Hall School
In the village of Old Tupton in North East Derbyshire, Tupton Hall is situated about four miles from Chesterfield, the nearest large town, despite the school being relatively close to the town, Chesterfield itself is not in the school's catchment area, which focuses on the town of Clay Cross and the villages of Wingerworth, Tupton and Ashover. Tupton Hall is a comprehensive school, so does not selectively admit pupils.

For results at A Level and GCSE, 95% of students attain grades above the national average, and the exam results for the school as a whole are also above the England average.

Sixth form
Tupton Hall has one of the largest sixth forms in the North East Derbyshire area, with nearly 400 students.

Notable former pupils

As a grammar school
 Sir Geoffrey Allen, chemist, chancellor from 1993-2003 of the University of East Anglia, and head of research from 1981 to 1990 at Unilever
 Emmanuel Cooper, potter
 George Eason, professor of mathematics from 1970 to 1983 at the University of Strathclyde, and former dean of the School of Mathematics and Physics, and expert in solid mechanics
 Ian Hall, cricketer for Derbyshire
 Colin Holmes, professor of history from 1989 to 1998 at the University of Sheffield
 Bill Leivers, footballer
 Dennis Skinner, Labour MP between 1970 and 2020 for Bolsover

As a comprehensive
 Ben Miles, actor.
 Savannah Stevenson, actress
 Jacob Whittle, swimmer and Olympian

Former teachers
 Roger Walker, taught drama at the comprehensive in the early 1970s.

References

External links
 Tupton Hall School website.
 Tupton Hall info website

Educational institutions established in 1929
Secondary schools in Derbyshire
Academies in Derbyshire
1929 establishments in England
Schools in Chesterfield, Derbyshire